Sir Gerald Woods Wollaston  (2 June 1874 – 4 March 1957) was a long-serving officer of arms at the College of Arms in London. Wollaston's family had a firm tradition at the College of Arms. Wollaston's great-grandfather was Sir William Woods, Garter Principal King of Arms from 1838 until his death in 1842. His grandfather was Sir Albert William Woods who held the same post from 1869 to 1904.

Wollaston's first heraldic post came in 1902 with his appointment as Fitzalan Pursuivant of Arms Extraordinary. This appointment came on the coronation of King Edward VII and Queen Alexandra in that year. He held this post until becoming a member of the College chapter on 11 January 1906 as Bluemantle Pursuivant of Arms in Ordinary.  

On 26 February 1919, Wollaston was promoted to the office of Richmond Herald of Arms in Ordinary. He remained a herald in ordinary until 1929, when he was appointed Norroy King of Arms. He became Garter Principal King of Arms in 1930 to replace Henry Burke.  

He was appointed a Knight Commander of the Royal Victorian Order in the 1935 New Year Honours and a Knight Commander of the Order of the Bath in the 1937 Coronation Honours.  Wollaston retired from the post of Garter in 1944 to become the second Norroy and Ulster King of Arms and served as such until his death in 1957.

Arms

See also
Pursuivant
King of Arms

References

CUHAGS Officer of Arms Index

English officers of arms
English knights
British genealogists
Knights Commander of the Order of the Bath
Knights Commander of the Royal Victorian Order
1874 births
1957 deaths
Garter Principal Kings of Arms